Elections to Newtownabbey Borough Council were held on 18 May 1977 on the same day as the other Northern Irish local government elections. The election used four district electoral areas to elect a total of 21 councillors.

Election results

Note: "Votes" are the first preference votes.

Districts summary

|- class="unsortable" align="centre"
!rowspan=2 align="left"|Ward
! % 
!Cllrs
! % 
!Cllrs
! %
!Cllrs
! %
!Cllrs
! %
!Cllrs
!rowspan=2|TotalCllrs
|- class="unsortable" align="center"
!colspan=2 bgcolor="" | UUP
!colspan=2 bgcolor="" | Alliance
!colspan=2 bgcolor="" | DUP
!colspan=2 bgcolor="" | UPNI
!colspan=2 bgcolor="white"| Others
|-
|align="left"|Area A
|bgcolor="#40BFF5"|63.3
|bgcolor="#40BFF5"|3
|14.9
|1
|17.7
|1
|0.0
|0
|4.1
|0
|5
|-
|align="left"|Area B
|bgcolor="#40BFF5"|34.1
|bgcolor="#40BFF5"|2
|18.9
|1
|16.0
|1
|0.0
|0
|31.0
|2
|6
|-
|align="left"|Area C
|26.4
|1
|bgcolor="#F6CB2F"|33.5
|bgcolor="#F6CB2F"|2
|17.2
|1
|11.5
|1
|11.4
|0
|5
|-
|align="left"|Area D
|37.2
|2
|bgcolor="#F6CB2F"|38.9
|bgcolor="#F6CB2F"|2
|23.9
|1
|0.0
|0
|0.0
|0
|5
|-
|- class="unsortable" class="sortbottom" style="background:#C9C9C9"
|align="left"| Total
|38.1
|8
|28.4
|6
|19.0
|4
|3.5
|1
|11.0
|2
|21
|-
|}

Districts results

Area A

1973: 4 x UUP, 1 x DUP
1977: 3 x UUP, 1 x DUP, 1 x Alliance
1973-1977 Change: Alliance gain from UUP

Area B

1973: 2 x UUP, 1 x Alliance, 1 x NILP, 1 x Loyalist, 1 x United Loyalist
1977: 2 x UUP, 1 x DUP, 1 x Alliance, 1 x Newtownabbey Labour, 1 x Loyalist
1973-1977 Change: DUP gain from United Loyalist, NILP joins Newtownabbey Labour

Area C

1973: 3 x UUP, 1 x Alliance, 1 x DUP
1977: 2 x Alliance, 1 x UUP, 1 x DUP, 1 x UPNI
1973-1977 Change: Alliance and UPNI gain from UUP (two seats)

Area D

1973: 3 x UUP, 1 x Alliance, 1 x DUP
1977: 2 x Alliance, 2 x UUP, 1 x DUP
1977-1981 Change: Alliance gain from UUP

References

Newtownabbey Borough Council elections
Newtownabbey